Grimes (formerly Grimes Landing) is a census-designated place in Colusa County, California on the Southern Pacific Railroad. It lies at an elevation of 46 feet (14 m). The two main roads that run through it are State Route 45 and Grimes-Arbuckle Road. Its ZIP code is 95950, and its area code is 530. Grimes's population was 391 at the 2020 census.

History
The post office was established in 1883.  Grimes is named after Cleaton Grimes, who obtained the townsite land in 1844.

The Cecil Ranch in Grimes is listed on the National Register of Historic Places, partly for the architecture of its architect-designed main house, built in 1909.

Features
Grimes is located near the Sacramento River, on Highway 45 between Colusa and Knight's Landing. There is a convenience store, a small post office, a public library, and an elementary school. The school features grades kindergarten through 6th grade. There is a boat landing on the river to the south of the town, which also serves as a restaurant for the community.

Demographics

The 2010 United States Census reported that Grimes had a population of 391. The racial makeup of Grimes was 284 (72.6%) White, 7 (1.8%) African American, 3 (0.8%) Native American, 1 (0.3%) Asian, 0 (0.0%) Pacific Islander, 65 (16.6%) from other races, and 31 (7.9%) from two or more races. Hispanic or Latino of any race were 258 persons (66.0%).

The Census reported that 391 people (100% of the population) lived in households, 0 (0%) lived in non-institutionalized group quarters, and 0 (0%) were institutionalized.

There were 130 households, out of which 48 (36.9%) had children under the age of 18 living in them, 73 (56.2%) were opposite-sex married couples living together, 13 (10.0%) had a female householder with no husband present, 5 (3.8%) had a male householder with no wife present.  There were 10 (7.7%) unmarried opposite-sex partnerships, and 0 (0%) same-sex married couples or partnerships. 33 households (25.4%) were made up of individuals, and 12 (9.2%) had someone living alone who was 65 years of age or older. The average household size was 3.01.  There were 91 families (70.0% of all households); the average family size was 3.70.

The population was spread out, with 120 people (30.7%) under the age of 18, 31 people (7.9%) aged 18 to 24, 96 people (24.6%) aged 25 to 44, 104 people (26.6%) aged 45 to 64, and 40 people (10.2%) who were 65 years of age or older.  The median age was 33.6 years. For every 100 females, there were 96.5 males.  For every 100 females age 18 and over, there were 97.8 males.

The homeowner vacancy rate was 4.1%; the rental vacancy rate was 9.2%.  210 people (53.7% of the population) lived in owner-occupied housing units and 181 people (46.3%) lived in rental housing units.

Government

References

Census-designated places in Colusa County, California
Census-designated places in California